The Lewis Mill, near Telluride, Colorado, was built in 1910.  It was listed on the National Register of Historic Places in 2009.

It is a 60-ton capacity ore concentration mill.

See also
Matterhorn Mill, a full flotation mill, also NRHP-listed in San Miguel County

References

National Register of Historic Places in San Miguel County, Colorado
Buildings and structures completed in 1910
Telluride, Colorado